Jataúba is a city in Pernambuco, Brazil.

Geography
 State - Pernambuco
 Region - Agreste Pernambucano
 Boundaries - Paraiba state (N); Belo Jardim (S); Brejo da Madre de Deus and Santa Cruz do Capibaribe (E); Poção and Paraiba (W)
 Area - 719.22 km2
 Elevation - 516 m
 Hydrography - Capibaribe River
 Vegetation - Caatinga Hipoxerófila
 Clima - semi-arid, hot
 Annual average temperature - 22.7 c
 Distance to Recife - 225 km
 Population - 17,228 (2020)

Economy
The main economic activities in Jataúba are based in commerce and agribusiness, especially the raising of goats, cattle, sheep and pigs.

Economic indicators

Economy by sector
2006

Health indicators

References

Municipalities in Pernambuco